Punyakoti, also released as A Truthful Mother, is a 2020 Indian Sanskrit-language animated film directed by Ravishankar Venkateswaran. It is the first animated film in Sanskrit.

Punyakoti is an adaptation of a picture book for children written by Ravishankar, was produced through crowdsourcing and it is the first Sanskrit animated film. The film got certificate from Central Board of Film Certification on 18 March 2020, but its theatrical release was halted due to Corona pandemic. Finally Samskrita Bharati premiered the film through online streaming platform Vimeo on 25 March 2020 and Netflix added the film to its platform on 31 March 2020.

Summary
Punyakoti is based on a famous folksong in Karnataka written by in the Kannada language about a cow that speaks the truth at all times. The story depicts man-animal conflict in a form that is both entertaining and informative. The movie carries the message of honesty and living in harmony with nature. The story is set in Karunadu, a village along the banks of Kaveri during the Vedic period. The original source of the folk-song is the eighteenth chapter of Srishtikhand of Padma Purana.

Cast
Revathi as Punyakoti
Roger Narayan as Kalinga
Sneha Ravishankar
SR Leela
Vidya Shankar

Release
Punyakoti was first scheduled to release in 2016 but was later delayed to 2018. The film was shown at the 2019 Film Bazaar. The film was scheduled to release theatrically in April 2020 but was cast off due to the coronavirus pandemic and was released digitally on Netflix in the same month.

See also 
 Sanskrit cinema

References

External links 
 
 

2020 films
2020 animated films
Sanskrit-language films
Indian animated films
Indian children's films
2020s historical fantasy films
Hindu mythological films
Films scored by Ilaiyaraaja
Films based on Indian folklore
Indian direct-to-video films
Films not released in theaters due to the COVID-19 pandemic
Films about cattle
Films about tigers
Tigers in India